2017 IORA Summit was held on March 5–7, 2017 in Jakarta Convention Centre, Indonesia, between the members of the Indian Ocean Rim Association. It was the first IORA Summit and the 20th IORA meeting, previous meetings were only minister level. Leaders attending the summit included President of South Africa Jacob Zuma and President of Sri Lanka Maithripala Sirisena. China and Japan also attended the summit as dialogue partners. Some 12,000 security personnel, both the police and military, were deployed to secure the event.

References 

IORA Summit